The Morane-Borel monoplane (sometimes referred to with the retronym Morane-Saulnier Type A or simply the Morane monoplane; company designation Bo.1) was an early French single-engine, single-seat aircraft.  It was flown in several European air races.

Design
The Monoplane was a mid-wing tractor configuration monoplane powered by a 50 hp Gnome Omega seven-cylinder rotary engine driving a two-bladed Chauvière Intégrale propeller. The fuselage was a rectangular-section wire-braced box girder, with the forward part covered in plywood and the rear part fabric covered: the rear section was left uncovered in some examples. The two-spar wings had elliptical ends and were braced by a pyramidal cabane in front of the pilot and an inverted V-strut underneath the fuselage, behind the undercarriage. Lateral control was effected by wing warping and the empennage consisted of a fixed horizontal stabiliser with tip-mounted full-chord elevators at either end and an aerodynamically balanced rudder, with no fixed vertical surface. In later examples the horizontal surfaces were modified, and consisted of a fixed surface with balanced elevators hinged to the trailing edge.<ref name=flight_651>The Borel Monoplane[[Flight International|Flight]] 20 July 1912 p. 651</ref> The undercarriage consisted of a pair of short skids, each carried on a pair of struts, and a pair of wheels on a cross-axle bound to the skids by bungee cords, and a tailskid.

Operational history
The Monoplane achieved fame when Jules Védrines flew one to victory in the 1911 Paris-to-Madrid air race, the only competitor to finish the four-day course.  Later in the year he came second in the Circuit of Britain, flying an aircraft powered by a 70 hp Gnome.   Another was flown by André Frey in the Paris-Rome race in 1911, finishing third. Emile Taddéoli was another owner of a Morane monoplane.

A two-seat version, powered by an 80 Gnome was entered for the 1912 British Military Aeroplane Competition.

Surviving examples
As of 2007 a single example remained extant, undergoing conservation work at the Canada Aviation Museum.

Operators
 
Argentine Air Force

Brazilian Naval Aviation

Romanian Air Corps

Royal Navy
Royal Naval Air Service

Specifications
From:  l'Aérophile,'' 15 April 1911, p. 170

References

Further reading

External links

 aviafrance.com
 Borel-Morane Monoplane, Canada Aviation and Space Museum
 Morane-Borel MonoplaneFlight, July 29, 1911.

1910s French sport aircraft
Racing aircraft
Single-engined tractor aircraft
Aircraft first flown in 1911
Mid-wing aircraft
Rotary-engined aircraft
Borel aircraft
Morane-Saulnier aircraft